Worst Superpower Ever is an EP for children released by the nerd-folk duo The Doubleclicks on April 30, 2012.

Track listing

External links 
 

2012 EPs
The Doubleclicks albums
Children's music albums by American artists